The 2014 Tour de Bretagne Féminin was the 9th edition of the Tour de Bretagne Féminin, a women's cycling stage race in France. It was rated by the UCI as a category 2.2 race and was held between 16 and 20 July 2014.

Teams competing

Stages

Prologue
16 July 2014 – Plédran to Plédran,

Stage 1
17 July 2014 – St. Méen-le-Grand to St. Méen Le Grand,

Stage 2
18 July 2014, – Radenac to Radenac (individual time trial),

Stage 3
19 July 2014 – Guingamp to Yffiniac,

Stage 4
20 July 2014 – Lampaul-Ploudalmézeau to Landivisiau,

Classification leadership

See also

 2014 in women's road cycling

References

2014 in women's road cycling
2014 in French sport